Anthology Film Archives is an international center for the preservation, study, and exhibition of film and video, with a particular focus on independent, experimental, and avant-garde cinema. The film archive and theater is located at 32 Second Avenue on the southeast corner of East 2nd Street, in a New York City historic district in the East Village neighborhood of Manhattan.

History

Anthology Film Archives evolved from roots and visions that date from the early 1960s, when Lithuanian artist Jonas Mekas, the founder and director of the Film-makers’ Cinematheque, a showcase for avant-garde films, dreamed of establishing a permanent home where the growing number of new independent and avant-garde films could be shown on a regular basis. This dream became a reality in 1969 when Jerome Hill, P. Adams Sitney, Peter Kubelka, Stan Brakhage, and Mekas drew up plans to create a museum dedicated to the vision of the art of cinema as guided by the avant-garde sensibility. A Film Selection committee – James Broughton, Ken Kelman, Kubelka, Mekas, and Sitney – was formed to establish a definitive collection of films (The Essential Cinema Repertory) and to determine the structure of the new institution.

Anthology opened on November 30, 1970, at Joseph Papp's Public Theater with Jerome Hill as its sponsor. After Hill's death in 1974, Anthology relocated to 80 Wooster Street in SoHo. Pressed by the need for more adequate space, it acquired its present home, a former municipal courthouse, in 1979. Under the guidance of the architects Raimund Abraham and Kevin Bone and at a cost of $1,450,000, the building was adapted to house two motion picture theaters, a reference library, a film preservation department, offices, and a gallery, opening to the public on October 12, 1988.

In 1998, New York University film students began NewFilmmakers, which became a popular weekly series having screened many thousands of documentary, short, and feature films.

Programs and collections
Anthology Film Archives screens nearly 1,000 public programs annually; features weekly in-person appearances by artists with their work; and publishes historical and scholarly books and catalogs. Anthology maintains an invaluable collection of approximately 20,000 films and 5,000 videotapes and preserves 25-35 films each year with more than 900 titles preserved to date. Anthology's research library holds the world's largest collection of paper materials documenting the history of American and international film and video as art, and is accessed weekly by students, scholars, researchers, writers, artists, and curators.

Notable artists represented in the collection 

Vito Acconci
Peggy Ahwesh
Kenneth Anger
Bruce Baillie
Ericka Beckman
Jordan Belson
Wallace Berman
Edward Bland
Lizzie Borden
Stan Brakhage
Robert Breer
James Broughton
Rudy Burckhardt
Mary Ellen Bute
Shirley Clarke
Bruce Conner
Tony Conrad
Joseph Cornell
Storm de Hirsch
Manuel De Landa
Maya Deren
Robert Downey, Sr.
Ed Emshwiller
Fluxus
Hollis Frampton
Robert Frank
Ernie Gehr
Bette Gordon
Dwinell Grant
Alexander Hammid
Hilary Harris
Jerome Hill
J. Hoberman
Peter Hutton
Ken Jacobs
Joan Jonas
Larry Jordan
Marjorie Keller
Peter Kubelka
George Kuchar
Mike Kuchar
Frank Kuenstler
George Landow
Fernand Léger
Alfred Leslie
Helen Levitt
Len Lye
Danny Lyon
Willard Maas
George Maciunas
Gregory Markopoulos
Jim McBride
Taylor Mead
Jonas Mekas
Marie Menken
Robert Nelson
Nam June Paik
Sidney Peterson
Luther Price
Ron Rice
Hans Richter
Lionel Rogosin
Barbara Rubin
Carolee Schneemann
Paul Sharits
Harry Smith
Jack Smith
Michael Snow
Warren Sonbert
Frank Stauffacher
Amy Taubin
Stan Vanderbeek
Andy Warhol
Joyce Weiland
Jud Yalkut

The building
Manhattan Third District Magistrate's Courthouse and Jail, aka New Essex Market Courthouse, at 32 Second Avenue (aka 43-45 East 2nd Street), opened on April 30, 1919. The three-story brick and terra cotta building was designed in the Renaissance Revival style by Alfred Hopkins, author of a book on prison construction. The design replaced a more ambitious 1913 plan for a 14-story municipal tower.

One of the most notorious gang murders in a neighborhood then notorious for its gangs occurred outside the courthouse doors on August 28, 1923, when "Kid Dropper" was assassinated by gunman Louis Cohen.

The court relocated after February 1946, and the building became a youth center for the Police Athletic League. After 1948, the building was known as the Lower Manhattan Magistrate's Courthouse.

The building lies within the East Village/Lower East Side Historic District, designated by the New York City Landmarks Preservation Commission in 2012.

In popular culture
In the 2004 film Spider-Man 2, the Anthology Film Archives building was used as the exterior of Doctor Octopus' laboratory.

References

External links

Official website
Complete list of films in the Essential Cinema Repertory

Film archives in the United States
Experimental film
Culture of Manhattan
1970 establishments in New York City
Cinemas and movie theaters in Manhattan
Repertory cinemas
Arts organizations based in New York City
East Village, Manhattan
Jonas Mekas